Ketchuptown is a historic unincorporated community and census-designated place (CDP) located in Horry County, South Carolina, United States. As of the 2020 census, it had a population of 84.
  
Ketchuptown is a small homestead and farming community. During the 1920s farmers in the community would say to one another, "Lets go catch up on the news." Every Saturday afternoon would find them at a little country store in Ketchuptown. Highway 99 led east  to Loris and southwest  to Galivants Ferry.

Demographics

2020 census

Note: the US Census treats Hispanic/Latino as an ethnic category. This table excludes Latinos from the racial categories and assigns them to a separate category. Hispanics/Latinos can be of any race.

References

External links
Ketchuptown (Horry County Board of Architectural Review)
"Ketchuptown, 1927-1994; The Place To Catch Up On The News," by Ruth Ham (Horry County Historical Society)

Census-designated places in South Carolina
Census-designated places in Horry County, South Carolina
Unincorporated communities in South Carolina
Unincorporated communities in Horry County, South Carolina